Mommo the Bogeyman is a 2009 Turkish drama film, written, produced and directed by Atalay Taşdiken, about two young siblings who find refuge with their grandfather after their mother dies and their father's new wife rejects them.

Production
The film was shot on location in Konya, Turkey.

Plot 
Two young siblings, Ahmet and Ayse, find refuge with their grandfather after their mother dies and their father's new wife rejects them. The old man however is not able to care for them and finally has to take the children apart. This simple, poignant tale of a village, and the relationship between a brother and sister, portrays very gritty living circumstances in rural Anatolia.

Reception

Awards 
 Würzburg International Filmweekend - Audience Award (Won)

See also 
 2009 in film
 Turkish films of 2009

External links
  for the film

References

2009 films
Turkish drama films
2009 drama films
Films set in Turkey